The American Revolution is an American three-part television series highlighting the origins and various events of the American Revolution. The series was broadcast on the American Heroes Channel. Its first two parts aired on December 15, 2014 and its final part aired on December 16, 2014.

Episodes

See also
 List of television series and miniseries about the American Revolution
 List of films about the American Revolution

References

External links
 Official site
 

2010s American documentary television series
2014 American television series debuts
American military television series
Television series about the American Revolution
2014 American television series endings
American Heroes Channel original programming